Parc Hosingen is a commune in northern Luxembourg, in the canton of Clervaux. It lies on the border with Germany. It has an area of 70,65 km2

The commune of Parc Hosingen was formed on 1 January 2012 from the former communes of Consthum, Hosingen and Hoscheid (the latter formerly part of the canton of Diekirch).  The law creating Parc Hosingen was passed on 24 May 2011.

Populated places
The commune consists of the following villages:

 Consthum Section:
 Consthum
 Holzthum
 Geyershof (lieu-dit)

 Hoscheid Section:
 Hoscheid
 Houscheid-Dickt
 Oberschlinder
 Unterschlinder
 Markebach (lieu-dit)
 Kehrmuhle (lieu-dit)

 Hosingen Section:
 Bockholtz
 Dorscheid
 Hosingen
 Neidhausen
 Obereisenbach
 Rodershausen
 Untereisenbach
 Wahlhausen
 Ackerscheid (lieu-dit)
 Dickt (lieu-dit)
 Dasbourg-Pont (lieu-dit) 
 Duerschterhaischen (lieu-dit)
 Fennbierg (lieu-dit)
 Honich (lieu-dit)
 Housenerbarrière (lieu-dit)
 Kohnenhaff (lieu-dit)
 Schmitzdell (lieu-dit)
 Veianenerstross (lieu-dit)
 Waldberg (lieu-dit)
 Wegscheid (lieu-dit)

Population

References

External links
 

Communes in Clervaux (canton)